In typesetting, a strut is an invisible character or element, used to ensure that a text has a minimum height and depth, even if no other elements are included.

For example, LaTeX and plain TeX provide the command
 \strut
to insert a font size-specific strut. In LaTeX it has a height of 70% of the baseline skip (the distance between the baselines of two consecutive lines of text) and a depth of 30% of the baseline skip. It ensures that two vertical stacked boxes which include such a strut have the same distance as two normal consecutive lines. LaTeX also supports the creation of general struts using the command:
 \rule[-depth]{0pt}{total height}

where \strut is equivalent in size to \rule[-.3\baselineskip]{0pt}{\baselineskip}.

References

Typesetting